Raderach was the World War II location of Prüffeld-Anlage Raderach, a V-2 rocket test facility code named "Porcelain Factory".  Raderach testing ensured V-2 turbopumps did not overpressure combustion chambers (there was no controller) and was planned for rocket motors to be installed by the nearby Zeppelin Works as part of the Eastern Works (V-2 facilities in the Vienna-Freidrichshafen area).  Firings were visible in Switzerland across Lake Constance and testing ended shortly after the facility began operation.

The first design sketches for the Raderach facility were prepared by Bernhard Tessmann of the Peenemünde Army Research Center, and Captain König was the military representative at Raderach.  By mid-1942, the German Army had started construction of the Raderach motor test stand, and a nearby liquid oxygen (A-stoff) plant produced up to 900 tons/month.  On July 25, 1943, British V-2 intelligence reported that aerial photographic reconnaissance of Friedrichshafen depicted rocket firing sites like those at the Peenemünde Army Research Center.  On August 3, 1944, the test facility and the ZF Friedrichshafen at Friedrichshafen were bombed.  The 461st Bombardment Group's primary target was the "Raderach Chemical Works", and the Zahnradfabrik secondary target was also bombed.  The 485th Bombardment Group attacked the "Ober chemical works" on August 16.

References

German V-2 rocket facilities